Vincenzo Damini  (before 1700 – c.1749) was an Italian artist, a  pupil of Giovanni Antonio Pellegrini, who spent some time in England.

Life

Damini was born in Venice towards the end of the 17th century. He was  a pupil of Giovanni Antonio Pellegrini, whom he accompanied to England in about 1720.  His portrait of the London scenery painter John Devoto is known from  a mezzotint after it, made by John Faber. In the north transept of Lincoln Cathedral, he executed a wall painting of four bishops beneath Gothic canopies, replacing an older version of the same subject; his assistant while working on it was the English artist Giles Hussey. Also in Lincoln, he painted a fresco of the Ascension in the chancel  and apse of the church  of St Peter-at-Arches. The church was demolished in the 1930s,  but Damini's oil modello for  the work   survives.

Five decorative paintings inset into the plaster ceiling of a  room designed by James Gibbs for a house in Henrietta Street, London, are attributed to Damini. The entire room, dating from around 1727-32 is preserved in the Victoria and Albert Museum.

He returned to Italy in  1730, accompanied by Giles Hussey, whom, according to Edward Edwards he abandoned in Bologna, making off with his belongings. By 1737 he was in L'Aquila, in Abruzzo, where, in that year, he painted an altarpiece at the church of the monastery of San Giuliano. There are three works by him in the collection of the Museo Nazionale d'Abruzzo: Il battesimo di Gesù (1740),  San Tommaso d'Aquino incatena l'eresia (1739) and Carlo d'Angiò ai piedi della Vergine e San Tommaso d'Aquino (1741).

He died in L'Aquila in about 1749.

References

Year of birth unknown
Year of death unknown
18th-century Italian painters
Italian male painters
Painters from Venice
Italian portrait painters
Year of birth uncertain
18th-century Italian male artists